Vanessa Cruez (29 August 1996) is a Malaysian Indian model, actress and director who works in the Indian Tamil Kollywood industry. She was crowned World Miss University Malaysia 2018. She made her film debut with the Malaysian Tamil film Athaiyum Thaandi Punithamanathu in 2021. She also participated in the reality show Survivor (Tamil season 1) where she later emerged as the 2nd runner up of the show.

Career 
At a young age when she was a MSU student in Malaysia, Vanessa was crowned the winner of World Miss University Malaysia 2018, defeating 32 other participants. She made her film debut in the Malaysian Tamil film Athaiyum Thaandi Punithamanathu (2021) in which she announced that she will play the lead role in the film. She made her first television debut in India in the survival reality show Survivor (Tamil season 1) as a contestant. Vanessa also played a small role in the television comedy show Kalyana Kumar in 2017. 

She has acted in various different small budget short films in Malaysia as a lead. She is the co founder of Vikadakavi productions which is a program for young learning models. 

In 2021, Vanessa turned into a director and started directing a Malaysian Tamil drama, Nethraa which was released in July 2021. She was later crowned as Miss Fitness Asia International in 2021. She was also one of the top 15 finalists and represented her home state Selangor in the beauty pageant, Miss Malaysia Kebaya.

Filmography 

Film

Television

References

External links 

Living people
People from Selangor
1996 births
Malaysian film actresses
Malaysian television actresses
Malaysian people of Indian descent
Malaysian female models
Malaysian directors
Malaysian expatriate actresses in India
Actresses in Tamil cinema
Actresses in Tamil television
21st-century Malaysian actresses